Puccinia recondita is a  mushroom species belonging to the order of Pucciniales, family Pucciniaceae.

Description
This species occurs worldwide.

Biology
These fungi are endoparasites plant pathogens mainly infecting Balsaminaceae, Boraginaceae, Hydrophyllaceae, Ranunculaceae and Poaceae (especially wheat and rye). 

Symptoms of infestation are yellowish to brown spots and pustules on the leaf surfaces of the host plants.

Puccinia recondita f.sp. tritici C.O. Johnson - causes brown rust in wheat and triticale;
Puccinia recondita f.sp. secalis Miedaner, Klocke, Flath, Geiger & Weber 2012 - causes brown rust of rye [2].

In Iceland, Puccinia recondita ssp. borealis infects Agrostis canina, Anthoxanthum odoratum, Calamagrostis stricta, Hierochloe odorata and Thalictrum alpinum.

Gallery

See also 
 List of Puccinia species

Bibliography
George Baker Cummins: The Rust Fungi of Cereals, Grasses and Bamboos. Springer, Berlin 1971, ISBN 3-540-05336-0.

References

External links 
 Index Species Fungorum
  USDA ARS Fungal Database

Fungal plant pathogens and diseases
Rye diseases
Wheat diseases
recondita
Fungi described in 1857